Olivella miliola is a species of small sea snail, marine gastropod mollusk in the subfamily Olivellinae, in the family Olividae, the olives.  Species in the genus Olivella are commonly called dwarf olives.

Description
The length of the shell varies between 4 mm and 5 mm.

Members of this order are predominantly gonochoric broadcast spawners. Members grow from the embryonic stage to planktonic trochophore larvae to juvenile veligers before reaching their adult stage.

Distribution
O. miliola is a demersal sea snail and can be found in the tropical regions of the Western Atlantic. Also off Jamaica and Martinique; also on the Mid-Atlantic Ridge.

References

 Duclos P.L. (1844-1848). Oliva. In J.C. Chenu, Illustrations conchyliologiques ou description et figures de toutes les coquilles connues vivantes et fossiles, classées suivant le système de Lamarck modifié d'après les progrès de la science et comprenant les genres nouveaux et les espèces récemment découvertes: 5-28 
 Paulmier G. (2015). Les Olivellidae (Neogastropoda) des Antilles françaises. Description de quatre nouvelles espèces. Xenophora Taxonomy. 8: 3-23.
 Vervaet F.L.J. (2018). The living Olividae species as described by Pierre-Louis Duclos. Vita Malacologica. 17: 1-111

External links
 Orbigny A. d'. (1841-1853). Mollusques. In: R. de la Sagra (ed.). Histoire physique, politique et naturelle de l'Ile de Cuba. Arthus Bertrand, Paris. Vol 1: 1-264

miliola
Gastropods described in 1842